The 1998–99 Eliteserien season was the 60th season of ice hockey in Norway. Ten teams participated in the league, and Valerenga Ishockey won the championship.

Regular season

Playoffs

Relegation 
 Gjøvik - Viking Hockey 1:2 (2:4, 5:3, 2:3)

External links
Season on hockeyarchives.info

GET-ligaen seasons
Norway
GET